Sidney Fay Blake (1892–1959) was an American botanist and plant taxonomist, "recognized as one of the world's experts on botanical nomenclature."

Biography
Blake was born in 1892 in Stoughton, Massachusetts. In 1912, he received a bachelor's degree from Harvard University, a master's degree in 1913, and a Ph.D. in botany in 1917 with a thesis on Viguiera. The same year he received his Ph.D., he started his botanical career at the Bureau of Plant Industry for the United States Department of Agriculture, and worked there till he died in 1959. In 1943 he was elected president of the American Society of Plant Taxonomists. Blake published many articles and monographs but only one two-volume work, Geographical Guide to Floras of the World. The first volume, co-authored by Alice C. Atwood (1876–1947), was published in 1942. The second volume, written by Blake alone, was published in 1961 two years after his death.

He married the entomologist Doris M. Holmes in 1918. They had one daughter.

In 1930, botanist Standl. published Neoblakea, a genus of flowering plants from South America,belonging to the family Rubiaceae, with the name honouring Sidney Fay Blake. Then in 2011, botanists E.E.Schill. and Panero published Sidneya, which is a genus of flowering plants from Mexico and surrounds belonging to the family Asteraceae.

References

20th-century American botanists
1892 births
1959 deaths
Harvard University alumni
People from Stoughton, Massachusetts